The 2014–15 was the 102nd full season in the history of Cambridge United, in which it competed in the League Two, along with various cup competitions.

Match details

Pre-season

League Two

League table

Matches
The fixtures for the 2014–15 season were announced on 18 June 2014 at 9am.

FA Cup

The draw for the first round of the FA Cup was made on 27 October 2014.

League Cup

The draw for the first round was made on 17 June 2014 at 10am. Cambridge United were drawn away to Birmingham City.

Football League Trophy

Transfers

See also 
2014–15 in English football
2014–15 Football League Two

References

Cambridge United F.C. seasons
Cambridge United